Mohamed Ridha Chalghoum is a Tunisian politician. He was the Minister of Finance from 2010 to 2011 and from 2017 to 2020.

Biography
Mohamed Ridha Chalghoum was born in Gafsa, Tunisia in 1962. He has a B.A. in Economics and a degree from the Tunisian Institute of National Defense. He was Minister of Finance on January 14, 2010 to January 27, 2011, and appointed as Finance Minister on September 6, 2017.

References

1962 births
Finance ministers of Tunisia
Government ministers of Tunisia
Living people